Ash Mill is a village in Devon, England.

Ashmill was the site of Ashwater station on the former L.S.W.R. North Cornwall line which closed in the 1960s. The station survives as a private residence.

References

External links

Villages in Devon